The Valea lui Coman (also: Pârâul lui Coman, in its upper course also: Valea Fiașului) is a left tributary of the river Dâmbovița in Romania. Its source is in the Leaota Mountains. It flows into the Dâmbovița in Valea Cetățuia.

References

Rivers of Romania
Rivers of Argeș County